Apil-kin ( a-pil-gin6), was a ruler of the city of Mari, northern Mesopotamia, after the fall of the Akkadian Empire c. 2126-2091 BCE. He was a son of Ishgum-Addu, and ruled 35 years, according to the Shakkanakku Dynasty List. He had two sons, who succeeded him in turn: Ili-Ishar and Tura-Dagan. 

He held the title of Shakkanakku (military governor), which was borne by all the princes of a dynasty who reigned at Mari in the late third millennium and early second millennium BCE. These kings were the descendants of the military governors appointed by the kings of Akkad. He was contemporary of the Third Dynasty of Ur, and probably their vassal. 

He was a contemporary of Ur-Nammu. He had a daughter named Taram-Uram, who became the First Queen of king Shulgi of Ur III. In a dedication, she called herself "daughter-in-law of Ur-Nammu", and "daughter of  Apil-kin, Lugal ("King") of Mari", suggesting for Apil-kin a position as a supreme ruler, and pointing to a marital alliance between Mari and Ur.

On some of his inscriptions, Apil-kin uses the title dannum''' ("the Great") in front of his function Shakkanakku ("Military Governor"), a practice for which he is the first to be attested at Mari, and which was initially introduced by Naram-Sin of the Akkadian Empire. Apil-kin and his successors generally used the Akkadian style of royal inscriptions and titulature. It is considered that the Shakkanakkus gained some form of independence and came to be considered as "Kings" from the time of Apil-kin.

One of the inscriptions of Apil-kin, inscribed on a bronze plaque, reads:

The "Sahuri''" built by Apil-kin is thought to be the name of a building or structure at Mari.

References

21st-century BC rulers
Kings of Mari
21st-century BC people